Cicatrization or cicatrisation (from Latin cicatrix, meaning "scar") is the contraction of fibrous tissue formed at a wound site by fibroblasts, reducing the size of the wound while distorting tissue.
Cicatrization may refer to:
 The process of a wound healing to produce scar tissue
 Scarification, a form of body modification that uses cicatrization to create patterns on the skin

fr:Cicatrisation